The 2010 Cork Intermediate Football Championship was the 75th staging of the Cork Intermediate Football Championship since its establishment by the Cork County Board.

The final was played on 17 October 2010 at Páirc Uí Chaoimh in Cork, between Macroom and Kildorrery, in what was their first ever meeting in the final. Macroom won the match by 1-09 to 0-10 to claim their third championship title overall and a first title in 20 years.

Results

Final

References

2010 in Irish sport
Cork Intermediate Football Championship